This is a list of episodes for the third season (1952–53) of the television version of The Jack Benny Program. This season the program was the 12th highest-ranked television show.

Season 3 was the first televised season of The Jack Benny Program to air on a regular schedule, appearing once every four weeks. The next season would increase the show's frequency to every three weeks; by the fifth season, it would settle into appearing every two weeks, a pattern it would follow for the next several years.

Episodes

References
 
 

1952 American television seasons
1953 American television seasons
Jack 03